In differential geometry, the third fundamental form is a surface metric denoted by .  Unlike the second fundamental form, it is independent of the surface normal.

Definition

Let  be the shape operator and  be a smooth surface. Also, let  and  be elements of the tangent space . The third fundamental form is then given by

Properties

The third fundamental form is expressible entirely in terms of the first fundamental form and second fundamental form. If we let  be the mean curvature of the surface and  be the Gaussian curvature of the surface, we have

See also
Metric tensor
First fundamental form
Second fundamental form
 Tautological one-form

Differential geometry of surfaces
Differential geometry
Surfaces